En busca del paraíso, is a Mexican telenovela produced by Televisa and originally transmitted by Telesistema Mexicano.

Cast 
Guillermo Murray
Jacqueline Andere
Norma Herrera
Miguel Macía

References

External links 

Televisa telenovelas
1968 telenovelas
1968 Mexican television series debuts
1968 Mexican television series endings